Veritism was a socio-philosophical ideology promoted by the "Veritism Foundation" (apparently now defunct). It argues that humanity has been presented with no conclusive evidence lending credence to the existence of a specific deity, or supreme entity and thus has no justification for reaching any kind of conclusions on the nature of such a being other than that (as represented by humanity's current state) it is a benign force.

Basic Propositions

On History
Veritism proposes that man has been engaged in an unfruitful search for truth since his creation.
Veritism also emphasizes that some, not having found truth, or lacking direction in their own lives, have rejected the existence of absolute truth, thus embracing atheistic, nihilistic ideologies.
History is a crucial aspect in Veritism, as most of Veritistic theory rests upon the conclusion that truth must be revealed unto humanity by an external means. The past lends credence to this conclusion, as throughout human history multiple theories and ideologies have been discarded. Essentially, philosophy is a dynamic subject, constantly in a state of change: conclusions are eternally tested, challenged, and discarded, only to be quickly and efficiently replaced by those seemingly more plausible.

On Ultimate Truth
Veritism suggests that humanity may only theorize upon non-observable studies. Man can draw conclusions concerning solid, physical sciences such as mathematics or chemistry. But he cannot claim he has undeniably and irrefutably answered questions relative to philosophy. Thus the only logical absolute concerning objective philosophical truth is that it simply does not exist. Yet many discard this statement, saying that it denies its own antecedent (one claims an absolute when he denies the existence of absolute truth). Yet upon examination of this particular antecedent we find that it is specific to a certain kind of truth, and thus claims only that truths asserted from a certain medium cannot be conclusive. As an example, any type of personal revelation or "vision" cannot be deemed as legitimate, as there is ultimately no way to prove that it was of divine cause or of personal accord. In Veritism the question becomes "what is the nature of truths presented?", "what is their claim?" and "is that claim plausible?"

On Religion
Veritism dismisses organized religion or any claim to ultimate truth as ignorant and without grounds.

On Reality
A veritistic view of reality is rather basic. That which can be perceived by the five senses is that which exists.

On Ethics
Veritistic ethics would advocate that humans have an inherent view of that which is right or wrong. This is demonstrated in law and government. The only humans lacking any type of self morals or ethical inclination are those with a mental or psychological dysfunction. Veritism consequently suggests that there are numerous cultural factors which influence behavior concerning ethics, sometimes in a negative way.
Veritistic thinking also attributes action to negative consequence. Some may subscribe to a religion simply because they fear a negative afterlife. Those who are truly moral, ethical people are those who do good with no ultimate reward, simply because it is the right thing to do.

Further reading
 Globus, Alfred R. "Veritism". Long Island City, N.Y., Distributed by the Veritism Foundation, 1968? Reprinted in 1988 by the Foundation for Science & Theology
 Kierkegaard on the Internet: Anonymity vs. Commitment in the Present Age, Hubert Dreyfus, 2004.

References

New religious movements